WebApp.Net (WAn) was an open-source web application framework by Chris Apers ("Chrilith") for the iPhone, iPod Touch and other WebKit based browsers.  WebApp.Net used a combination of JavaScript, Cascading Style Sheets, and images to copy the native iPhone and iPod Touch user interfaces. Chris Apers was also the author of "Beginning iPhone and iPad Web Apps" published by Apress which was translated into Spanish and French.

History
 2010-02-06 - v0.5.2
 2009.11.16 - v0.5.0
 2008.10.03 - v0.3.9a
 2008.05.08 - first released

See also
 iPhone Web Applications
 Safire
 iUI (software)
 iWebKit

References

External list
 WebApp.Net home
 Apress

JavaScript libraries